223 Robert Street, Victoria, British Columbia is a historic house in Victoria, British Columbia that was completed in 1905 and designated as a heritage building in 1990. It is a good example of the Queen Anne Style architecture.

The house was badly damaged by fire on the night of April 28/29, 2020, but is being restored.

See also 
 List of historic places in Victoria, British Columbia

References 

Buildings and structures in Victoria, British Columbia
National Historic Sites in British Columbia
Houses completed in 1905
Queen Anne architecture in Canada
Buildings and structures on the National Historic Sites of Canada register
Houses in British Columbia
1905 establishments in Canada